Ronald Stein (born April 29, 1941; also known as Ron Stein) is an author, columnist, Engineer and energy policy advisor for Heartland Institute. He is the founder of Principal Technical Services (PTS).

Early life and education
Stein was born in Pittsburgh, Pennsylvania. He attended Santa Monica College. Stein received BS in Electrical Engineering from California State University, Northridge.

Personal life
Stein is married and has two children, Russell Stein, and David Stein.

Career
Stein started his career as a project manager at Fluor in July 1964. Later he worked as a project manager in Jaws Attraction, Florida, at Universal Studios in 1987.

He established PTS Staffing in April 1995. Since 2010, he has written different Op-eds about the energy sector and conservation. Stein started Energy Literacy, an initiative for educating the public about energy topics. He is a policy advisor on energy literacy at Heartland Institute and The Committee for a Constructive Tomorrow (CFACT).

In 2020, PTS was renamed as PTS Advance, and Stein became its Ambassador for Energy & Infrastructure. Stein is also a columnist and co-author of three books. His work has been featured in the Eurasia Review, the Heartland Institute, the Cornwall Alliance, and New Geography.

Awards

Books
Stein has co-authored three books with Todd Royal on energy literacy.

Energy Made Easy (2019)
Just Green Electricity (2020)
Clean Energy Exploitations (2021); a Pulitzer Prize-nominated book

References

External links
Energy Literacy

1941 births
Living people
American engineers
Renewable energy in the United States
People from Pittsburgh
California State University, Northridge alumni
Heartland Institute